Liu Jiao is a Chinese diver. She won a gold medal in the Girls' 3m springboard event at the 2010 Summer Youth Olympics.

References

 
 

Living people
Chinese female divers
Divers at the 2010 Summer Youth Olympics
Year of birth missing (living people)
Youth Olympic gold medalists for China
21st-century Chinese women